Zodarion fulvonigrum is a spider species found in France.

See also 
 List of Zodariidae species

References

External links 

fulvonigrum
Spiders of Europe
Spiders described in 1874